Second Hand Destiny is a 1949 West German drama film directed by Wolfgang Staudte and starring Erich Ponto, Heinz Klevenow and Marianne Hoppe. It is sometimes considered a film noir. At the time the director Staudte was mostly known for his work for the East German studio DEFA.

It was made between May and July 1949 at the Wandsbek Studios of the Hamburg-based company Real Film. The film's sets were designed by the art directors Albrecht Becker and Herbert Kirchhoff.

Synopsis
A man now working as a clairvoyant narrates in flashback how he has sunk from once being a happily married man to murdering his own wife.

Main cast

References

Bibliography

External links 
 

1949 films
1949 drama films
German drama films
West German films
1940s German-language films
Films directed by Wolfgang Staudte
Real Film films
Films shot in Hamburg
Films shot at Wandsbek Studios
German black-and-white films
1940s German films